Shakalaka Baby is a 2002 Tamil-language comedy film directed by Rama Narayanan  starring Roja. It was released on February 8, 2002. The music director S. A. Rajkumar composed the music for the film Shakalaka Baby. The film is based on the song "Shakalaka Baby" from Mudhalvan (1999).

Cast

Roja as Shenbagam (Shakalaka Baby)
Vivek as Sundara Chozhan
Vadivelu as Pandi
Manivannan as Aarusamy
Kovai Sarala as Aaravalli
Suvarna Mathew as Sooravalli
Radhika Chaudhari as Radhika
Kumarimuthu as Soorappan
Anu Mohan
Junior Balaiah as 'Pathu Rooba' Palraj
Bayilvan Ranganathan as Police Commissioner 
Thalapathy Dinesh
Kottai Perumal
Ramki (guest appearance)
Udhaya (guest appearance)

Soundtrack
There are five songs in Shakalaka Baby are composed by Rajkumar, with lyrics written by Kalidasan, Pa. Vijay, Viveka and K. Subash.

References

External links

2002 films
2000s Tamil-language films
Indian comedy films
Films directed by Rama Narayanan
Films scored by S. A. Rajkumar
2002 comedy films